Raúl Osvaldo Castronovo Zanón (born 11 January 1949) is an Argentine retired footballer who played as a striker.

Club career
Born in Rosario, Santa Fe, Castronovo began his career with local Rosario Central in 1968, but an economic crisis in 1970 prompted his move to Peñarol in Uruguay, where he became the top scorer of the 1971 edition of the Copa Libertadores, tied with Luis Artime at ten goals.

After playing in Ligue 1 with AS Nancy during three seasons, Castronovo moved to Spain where he remained until the end of his career, representing CD Málaga, Hércules CF, UD Salamanca and Algeciras CF and competing in both La Liga and Segunda División. On 27 April 1980, whilst a free agent, he was involved in a match fixing incident between the first and the third clubs which resulted in a two-year ban for himself, Málaga teammate Julio Orozco and Salamanca manager Felipe Mesones; he retired shortly after, aged only 31.

References

External links

1949 births
Living people
Argentine people of Spanish descent
Citizens of Spain through descent
Footballers from Rosario, Santa Fe
Argentine footballers
Association football forwards
Argentine Primera División players
Rosario Central footballers
Uruguayan Primera División players
Peñarol players
Ligue 1 players
AS Nancy Lorraine players
La Liga players
Segunda División players
CD Málaga footballers
Hércules CF players
UD Salamanca players
Algeciras CF footballers
Argentine expatriate footballers
Expatriate footballers in Uruguay
Expatriate footballers in France
Expatriate footballers in Spain
Argentine expatriate sportspeople in Uruguay
Argentine expatriate sportspeople in France
Argentine expatriate sportspeople in Spain